WUPY 101.1 FM (also called "Y-101") is a radio station broadcasting a country music format in Ontonagon, Michigan, United States, where it is licensed by the U.S. Federal Communications Commission. The station is owned by J & J Broadcasting. The studios are at 622 River St, downtown Ontonagon. The transmitter site is south on Route 45, near Rockland.

Programming 
WUPY exclusively airs a country music format, including all genere artists dating as far back as the 1930s. The station includes regular weekly and daily programs.  the station features local talent programs including: "The Jan Tucker Show", "The Jerry Schnieder Polka Show", "zMax Racing Country" and "Deer Hunters Round-Up" (during the local deer hunting season).

Following typical country music station schedule formatting, WUPY also include church service program broadcasting (often live) on Sundays, typically from 7 am to 11 am EST. In support of the local community, WUPY typically broadcasts coverage of high school sporting events including basketball and football games when in season. The station also occasionally broadcasts at specific local interest events.

The station also features syndicate shows including: "The Lia Show", "After Midnight", "The Crook & Chase Countdown" and "Country Hit Makers."

Technical details 
WUPY broadcasts on 101.1 Mhz FM at 100,000 watts Effective radiated power, covering approximately 150 radial miles (to signal fringe) in a non-directional pattern. The station transmitter tower is located on an elevated bluff outside of Rockland, Michigan. The transmitter tower base is 276 feet above the average surrounding terrain with the structure itself being 420 feet tall, giving the transmitter a total effective height of 696 feet.

History 
Documented history of the WUPY radio station is not accessible, but the following information has been located from publicly available sources:

WUPY began operations in Ontonagon, Michigan under the callsign "WONT" after being granted its FCC license on March 21, 1983. As part of a major retrofit of the station operations in 1989, the station changed its callsign to "WUPY". The station began broadcasting under the "WUPY" callsign on August 18, 1989.

Until the late 2000s, the station was semi-privately owned by J & J Broadcasting, Inc. Ownership of the station was transferred to SNRN Broadcasting, Inc. through a buy-out process.

The station renewed its FCC license in February 2007; the license remained valid until October 1, 2020.

Sources 
Michiguide.com - WUPY History
Radio Locator - WUPY-FM 101.1 MHz
WUPY Superior Country

External links

UPY-FM
Country radio stations in the United States
Radio stations established in 1983
1983 establishments in Michigan